Melville is a surname and a given name.

The surname has two different origins: Scottish and Irish. In Scotland, the name is a habitational name, originally of Norman origin, derived from any of several places called Malleville in Normandy. The place name Malleville is derived from the Latin elements malum ("bad") and villa ("country house"). In Ireland, the surname is an Anglicisation of the Gaelic Ó Maoilmhichíl, which means "descendant of Maoilmhichil". The Gaelic personal name Maoilmhichil means "devotee of (Saint) Michael". The surname is sometimes spelled without the terminal "e": Melvill.

The given name originates from England and Scotland. The name is derived from the Scottish surname.

Melville or Melvill may refer to:

People

Surname
Alan Melville (1910–1983), South African cricketer
Alan Melville (writer) (1910–1983), English playwright and composer
Alex Melville (disambiguation)
Alexander Gordon Melville (1819–1901), Irish anatomist
Alexander Melville, 5th Earl of Leven (died 1754)
Andy Melville (born 1968), Welsh footballer
Andrew Melville of Garvock (died 1617), Scottish courtier
Andrew Melville (1545–1622), Scottish theologian
Arthur Melville (1858–1904), Scottish painter
Charles Melville (1828–1867), American sailor
Charles Melvill (1878–1925), British soldier with the New Zealand Military Forces
Charles P. Melville, Professor of Persian History at Cambridge
Christian Melville (1913–1984), Scottish rugby player
Craig Melville (fl. 1990–2000s), Australian comedy director
Cyron Melville (born 1984), Danish actor and musician
Dan Melville (born 1956), American football player
David Melville (disambiguation)
Elizabeth Melville (1578–1640), Scottish poet
Ellen Melville (1882–1946), New Zealand politician
Emelie Melville (c. 1851–1932), actress in comic opera
Esme Melville (1918–2006), Australian actor
Francis Melville (disambiguation)
Frank Melville (1903–1971), Australian football player
Fred Melville (1882–1940), British philatelist
George Melville, 1st Earl of Melville (1636–1707), Scottish aristocrat and statesman
George W. Melville (1841–1912), American rear admiral, engineer, Arctic explorer and author
Gertrude Melville (1884–1959), Australian politician
Greg Melville (born 1979), American sportswriter
Harry Melville (disambiguation), several names:
 Harry Melville (chemist) (1908–2000), British chemist and academic administrator
 Harry Melville (rugby league) (1930–1965), Australian rugby league player
Henry Melvill (1798–1871), Anglican priest
Henry Melville (1799–1873), Australian author
Herman Melville (1819–1891), American author (Moby-Dick)
James Cosmo Melvill (1792–1861): a British administrator who served as the last secretary of the East India Company.
James Cosmo Melvill (1845–1929): British botanist and malacologist.
James Melville (disambiguation)
Jean-Pierre Melville (1917–1973), French film director
Jennie Melville, pen name of British crime fiction author Gwendoline Butler (1922–2013)
John Melville (disambiguation)
Josephine Melville (1961–2022), British actress, director and writer
June Melville (1915 - 1970), English actress and theatre manager 
Ken Melville (born 1931), Australian football player
Kerry Melville, birth name of Kerry Reid (born 1947), Australian tennis player
Lee Melville (born 1970), Bahamian cricket player
Sir Leslie Melville (1902–2002), Australian economist
Lewis Melville, pen name of British author Lewis Saul Benjamin (1874–1932)
Marvin Melville, American skier in the 1956, 1960 and 1964 Olympics - see United States at the 1956 Winter Olympics
Michael Linning Melville (1805–1878), Sierra Leone politician
Mike Melvill, American pilot
Miranda Melville (born 1989), American racewalker
Murray Melville, Scottish curler
Neil Melville (fl. 1980s), Australian actor
Nigel Melville (born 1961), British rugby player
Ninian Melville (1843–1897), Australian political figure
Paul Melville (1956–1978), Australian cricket player
Pauline Melville (born 1948), Guyanese-born British actress and writer
Philip Melvill (East India Company officer) (1796–1882), British official in India
Robert Melville (disambiguation)
Rodney Melville (fl. 1990–2000s), American judge
Ronald Melville (botanist) (1903–1985), English botanist
Rose Melville (1873–1946), American actor
Sam Melville (1934–1971), American anarchist
Sam Melville (actor) (1936–1989), American television actor
Scott Melville (born 1966), American tennis player
Stephen Melville (1904–1977), South African military man
Teignmouth Melvill (1842–1879), English lieutenant and recipient of the Victoria Cross
Thomas Melvill (1726–1753), Scottish natural philosopher
Thomas Melville (disambiguation)
Velma Caldwell Melville (1852–1924), American writer and poet
Ward Melville (1887–1977), American businessman and philanthropist
William Melville (1850–1918), Irish law enforcement official

Given name
Melville E. Abrams (1912–1966), American politician
Melville Arnott (1909–1999), British academic
Melville Sewell Bagley (1838–1880), American-born Argentine businessman and winemaker
Melville Baker (1901–1958), American film writer
Melville W. Beardsley (1913–1998), American inventor
Melville Reuben Bissell (1843–1889), American inventor and businessman
Mel Brandt (1919–2008), American actor
J. Melville Broughton (1888–1949), American politician
Melville W. Brown (1887–1938), American film director
Melville Bull (1854–1909), US political figure
Mel Bungey (born 1934), Australian political figure
Melville Henry Cane (1879–1980), American poet and lawyer
Melville Cook (1912–1993), British musician
Mel Cooke (1934–2013), New Zealand rugby player
Melville Cooper (1896–1973), British actor
Melville De Lloyd (1917–1985), Welsh rugby player
Melville Dewey (1851–1931), American library classification expert
Melville Eastham (1885–1964), American radio executive
Melville Fuller (1833–1910), American judge
Melville Gideon (1884–1933), American musician and composer
Melville S. Green (1922–1979), American physicist
Melville Bell Grosvenor (1901–1982), American magazine editor
Melville Guest (born 1943), British diplomat and cricketer
Melville Hatch (1898–1988), American entomologist
Melville J. Herskovits (1895–1963), American anthropologist
Melville R. Hopewell (1845–1911), American politician
Melville E. Ingalls (1842–1914), American politician
Melville Jacobs (1902–1971), American anthropologist
Melville James (1877–1957), Australian Anglican bishop
Melville Jones (1866–1941), Anglican bishop
Melville Clyde Kelly (1883–1935), American politician
Melville D. Landon (1839–1910), American journalist and humorist
Melville H. Long (1889–1969), American tennis player
Melville Lyons (1889–1955), New Zealand politician
Melville Macnaghten (1853–1921), British politician
Melville Henry Massue (1868–1921), British genealogist and author
Melville McKee (born 1994), British race car driver
Melville de Mellow (1913–1989), Indian radio personality
Mel Merritt (1897–1986), American football player
Melville Nimmer (1923–1985), American lawyer
Melville Pengelly (1901–1973), New Zealand cricket umpire
Melvil Poupaud (born 1973), French actor, author and filmmaker
Melville Portal (1819–1904), British politician
Melville Davisson Post (1869–1930), American author
Melville Marks Robinson (1888–1974), Canadian athlete and sports organizer
Melville Rogers (1899–1973), Canadian figure skater
Melville Ruick (1898–1972), American actor and musician
Melville Ryan (1933–2015), British cricket player
Melville J. Salter (1834–1896), American politician
Melville Amasa Scovell (1855–1912), American academic
Melville Shavelson (1917–2007), American film director
Melville J. Shaw (1872–1927), American Marine Corps colonel
Melville Shyer (1895–1968), American film director
Mel Spence (1936–2012), Jamaican sprinter
Melville Y. Stewart (born 1935), American educator
Melville Elijah Stone (1848–1929), American newspaper executive
Melville Vail (1906–1983), Canadian hockey player
Melville Waddington (1895–1945), Canadian pilot
Melville Wallace (1887–1943), South African sports shooter

Fictional characters
Jackson Melville, in the television series Gilmore Girls
Melville Crump, Sid Caesar's character in the 1963 motion picture It's a Mad Mad Mad Mad World
 Melville - Pet of fictional character Chuckie Finster in the television animated series Rugrats

See also
Ronald Ruthven Leslie-Melville, 11th Earl of Leven (1835–1906)

References

English masculine given names
English given names
English-language surnames
Scottish surnames
Melville family